Anne of the Thousand Days is a 1969 British period historical drama film based on the life of Anne Boleyn, directed by Charles Jarrott and produced by Hal B. Wallis. The screenplay by Bridget Boland and John Hale is an adaptation of the 1948 play of the same name by Maxwell Anderson.

The film stars Richard Burton as King Henry VIII and Canadian actress Geneviève Bujold as Anne Boleyn. Irene Papas plays Catherine of Aragon, Anthony Quayle plays Cardinal Thomas Wolsey, and John Colicos plays Thomas Cromwell. Others in the cast include Michael Hordern, Katharine Blake, Peter Jeffrey, Joseph O'Conor, William Squire, Vernon Dobtcheff, Denis Quilley, Esmond Knight, and T. P. McKenna, who later played Henry VIII in Monarch. Burton's wife Elizabeth Taylor makes a brief, uncredited appearance.

Despite receiving some negative reviews and mixed reviews from The New York Times and Pauline Kael, the film was nominated for 10 Academy Awards and won the award for best costumes. Geneviève Bujold's portrayal of Anne, her first in an English language film, was very highly praised, even by Time magazine, which otherwise skewered the movie. According to the Academy Awards exposé Inside Oscar, an expensive advertising campaign was mounted by Universal Studios that included serving champagne and filet mignon to members of the Academy following each screening.

Plot
In London, 1536, Henry VIII considers whether or not he should sign the warrant for the execution of his second wife, Anne Boleyn.

Nine years earlier, Henry has a problem: he reveals his dissatisfaction with his wife Catherine of Aragon. He is enjoying a discreet affair with Mary Boleyn, a daughter of one of his courtiers, Sir Thomas Boleyn; but the king is bored with her too. At a court ball, he notices Mary's 18-year-old sister Anne, who has returned from her education in France. She is engaged to the son of the Earl of Northumberland, and they have received their parents' permission to marry. The king, however, is enraptured with Anne's beauty and orders Cardinal Wolsey, his Lord Chancellor, to break the engagement.

When news of this decision is carried to Anne, she reacts furiously. She blames the cardinal and the king for ruining her happiness. When Henry makes a rather clumsy attempt to seduce her, Anne bluntly informs him how she finds him.

Henry brings her back to court with him, and she continues to resist his advances out of a mixture of repulsion for Henry and her lingering anger over her broken engagement. However, she becomes intoxicated with the power that the king's love gives her. Using this power, she continually undermines Cardinal Wolsey, who initially sees Anne as a passing love interest for the king.

When Henry again presses Anne to become his mistress, she repeats that she never will give birth to an illegitimate child. Desperate to have a son, Henry suddenly comes up with the idea of marrying Anne in Catherine's place. Anne is stunned, but she agrees. Wolsey begs the king to abandon the idea because of the political consequences of divorcing Catherine. Henry refuses to listen.

When Wolsey fails to persuade the pope to give Henry his divorce, Anne points out this failing to an enraged Henry. Wolsey is dismissed from office, and his magnificent palace in London is given as a present to Anne, who realizes she has finally fallen in love with Henry. They sleep together, and after discovering that she is pregnant, they secretly are married. Anne is given a splendid coronation, but the people jeer at her in disgust.

Months later, Anne gives birth to a daughter: Princess Elizabeth. Henry is displeased because he hoped for a boy, and their marital relationship begins to cool. His attentions are soon diverted to Lady Jane Seymour, one of Anne's maids. Once she discovers this liaison, Anne banishes Jane from court.

During a row over Sir Thomas More's opposition to Anne's queenship, Anne refuses to sleep with her husband unless More is put to death. More is put to death, but Anne's subsequent pregnancy ends with a stillborn boy.

Henry demands that his new minister Thomas Cromwell find a way to get rid of Anne. Cromwell tortures a servant in her household into confessing to adultery with the queen; he then arrests four other courtiers who are also accused of being Anne's lovers. Anne is taken to the Tower and placed under arrest. When she is told that she has been accused of adultery, Anne laughs until she sees her brother being brought into the Tower and learns he faces the same accusation.

At Anne's trial, she manages to cross-question Mark Smeaton, the tortured servant who finally admits that the charges against Anne are lies. Henry makes an appearance, then visits Anne in her chambers that night. He offers her freedom if she will agree to annul their marriage and make their daughter illegitimate. Anne refuses, saying that she would rather die than betray their daughter. Henry slaps her and tells her that her disobedience will mean her death.

Henry decides to execute Anne. A few days later, Anne is taken to the scaffold and beheaded by a French swordsman. Henry rides off to marry Jane Seymour, and their young daughter, Elizabeth, toddles alone in the garden as she hears the cannon firing to announce her mother's death.

Cast

Elizabeth Taylor has an uncredited cameo appearance as a masked courtesan who interrupts Queen Catherine's prayers. Kate Burton makes her acting debut as a maid.

Background and production
The play Anne of the Thousand Days, the film's basis, was first enacted on Broadway in the Shubert Theatre on 8 December 1948; staged by H.C. Potter, with Rex Harrison and Joyce Redman as Henry VIII and Anne Boleyn respectively, running 288 performances; Harrison won a Tony Award for his performance.

Cinematically, Anne of the Thousand Days took 20 years to reach the screen because its themes – adultery, illegitimacy, incest – were then unacceptable to the U.S. motion picture production code. The film was made on such locations as Penshurst Place and Hever Castle, and at Pinewood and Shepperton Studios.
Hever Castle was one of the main settings for the film; it was also the childhood home of Anne Boleyn.

British actress Olivia Hussey was the first choice for the role of Anne Boleyn. When producer Hal B. Wallis first met Hussey in New York in November 1967 at a party for her then upcoming film Romeo and Juliet (1968), he offered her the title role. In addition, he also offered her to star with John Wayne in True Grit (1969). In her 2019 memoir, Hussey stated that she had "mumbled something about being interested in Anne of the Thousand Days” but added that she "couldn’t see herself with Wayne". She claims that this "adolescent and opinionated" remark inevitably ended her professional relationship with Wallis, and he immediately withdrew his offer from her. "It had taken me less than a minute to talk my way out of it" Hussey stated.

Maxwell Anderson employed blank verse for parts of his play, but most examples of this were removed from the screenplay. One blank verse episode that was retained was Anne's soliloquy in the Tower of London. The opening of the play was changed, with Thomas Cromwell's telling Henry VIII the outcome of the trial and Henry's recalling his marriage to Anne rather than Anne's speaking first and then Henry's remembering in flashback.

Historical accuracy
 Historians dispute King Henry VIII's paternity of one or both of Mary Boleyn's children. Henry VIII: The King and His Court by Alison Weir questions the paternity of Henry Carey; Dr. G. W. Bernard (The King's Reformation) and Joanna Denny (Anne Boleyn: A New Life of England's Tragic Queen) argue that Henry VIII was their father.
 Anne Boleyn might not have been 18 years old in 1527; her birth date is unrecorded. Most historians today believe that she was in her early to mid 20s in 1527.
 There is no proof that Henry VIII ordered the breaking of Henry Percy and Anne Boleyn's engagement because he wanted Anne for himself. Percy's family, the Northumberlands, were one of the leading families in the North of England, and they always wanted Henry Percy to marry Mary Talbot, a rich heiress from the same region, and not a girl from a comparatively lower status family. They might have asked for the king's and Cardinal Wolsey's intervention when the engagement was made public. In fact, in order to have no impediment for Henry VIII's and Anne's marriage, all parties always denied that any engagement had taken place.
 Most histories of the period say nothing about Anne's pressuring Henry to have More executed.
 Catherine of Aragon's daughter, Mary, was not present at the time of Catherine's final illness and death; they were being kept apart forcibly.
 Catherine of Aragon's depiction by Irene Papas was wrong in terms of appearance; it is well documented that the queen had auburn hair and a very pale complexion, and that she had become fat by the time she was in her middle thirties. Papas was chosen as she has a stereotypical Mediterranean appearance, matching false popular assumptions on how a 'Spanish' noble would look. The same goes for Jane Seymour: here depicted as a brunette, she was in fact a blonde.
 The meeting between Anne and Henry shortly before her execution is fictional, and even if such a meeting had taken place, some details of their discussion are implausible. Anne's marriage was annulled anyway, and she never was offered a deal that would have given her her freedom. Elizabeth and Mary were both declared illegitimate, but were nevertheless in the line of succession, but not until after Anne's death. Thus, at that point, the chance of Elizabeth's inheriting the crown must have seemed small.
 Henry did not intervene in Anne's trial; she was disallowed the right to question the witnesses against her. She and the king met last at a joust the day before her arrest.
 Anne of the Thousand Days depicts Anne as innocent of the charges laid against her, and this is considered historically correct in the biographies by Eric W. Ives, Retha Warnicke, Joanna Denny, and David Starkey, which all assert her innocence of adultery, incest, and witchcraft.

Reception
The film received mixed reviews from critics, as most commonly they considered the plot dull and plodding. Beyond the story itself, the performances of Geneviève Bujold, Richard Burton, and Irene Papas were met with universal acclaim, especially that of Bujold. Bujold remains the only actress nominated for an Oscar for playing Anne Boleyn.

The film was one of the more popular movies of 1970 at the British box office.

Accolades

See also
 The Other Boleyn Girl
 The Other Boleyn Girl (2003 film)
 The Other Boleyn Girl (2008 film)
 Wolf Hall
 Wolf Hall (miniseries)

References

External links
 
 
 
 
 

1969 films
1960s historical drama films
1960s biographical drama films
British biographical drama films
British historical drama films
British epic films
1960s English-language films
Cultural depictions of Anne Boleyn
Cultural depictions of Catherine of Aragon
Cultural depictions of Thomas More
Films about capital punishment
Films about Henry VIII
British films based on plays
Films set in castles
Films set in Tudor England
Films set in the 1520s
Films set in the 1530s
Best Drama Picture Golden Globe winners
Films whose director won the Best Director Golden Globe
Films featuring a Best Drama Actress Golden Globe-winning performance
Films that won the Best Costume Design Academy Award
Plays by Maxwell Anderson
Universal Pictures films
Films directed by Charles Jarrott
Films produced by Hal B. Wallis
Films scored by Georges Delerue
1969 directorial debut films
1969 drama films
1960s British films